Zhang Xinlin (born 4 June 1992) is a Chinese football player who currently plays as a left-footed midfielder for China League One side Nanjing City.

Club career
In 2014, Zhang Xinlin started his professional footballer career with Jiangsu Sainty in the Chinese Super League. He made his Super league debut  on 25 May 2014 in a game against Shanghai East Asia, coming on as a substitute for Ji Xiang in the 86th minute. He was sent to the Suning reserved team in 2018.
On 23 February 2019, Zhang was loaned to League Two newcomer Taizhou Yuanda for the 2019 season.

On 15 April 2021, Zhang would transfer to another China League One club in Nanjing City.

Career statistics
Statistics accurate as of match played 28 November 2020.

Honours

Club
Jiangsu Sainty
Chinese FA Cup: 2015

References

External links

1992 births
Living people
Sportspeople from Nanjing
Chinese footballers
Footballers from Jiangsu
Jiangsu F.C. players
Taizhou Yuanda F.C. players
China League Two players
China League One players
Chinese Super League players
Association football midfielders